Ratnapura (Sinhala: රත්නපුර දිස්ත්‍රික්කය, Tamil: இரத்தினபுரம் மாவட்டம்) is a district of Sri Lanka in the Sabaragamuwa Province.

The gem-mining centre of Sri Lanka is also a major crossroad between southern plains and the hill country to the east. A bustling market city servicing most of the surrounding towns. Many of the prominent gem dealers in Sri Lanka operate from this town. 
There is a route to Sri Pada from Ratnapura direction. Excursions include Sinharaja Forest Reserve and Udawalawe National Park. The surrounding area is a popular trekking destination and a good place for bird watching.

Religion

The majority of the population are Buddhists. Other religions include Hinduism, Islam and Christianity.

Major cities

 Ratnapura (Municipal Council)

Large towns

 Balangoda (Urban Council)
 Embilipitiya (Urban Council)

Other towns
 Eheliyagoda 
 Pelmadulla
 Kuruwita
 Imbulpe 
 Godakawela 
 Kahawatta 
 Rakwana 
 Weligepola
 Nivitigala 
 Ayagama 
 Kalawana 
 Kolonna 
 Panamure
 Pohorabawa
 Pallebedda
 Udawalawe

Administration

For the administrative purpose district is divided into 18 Divisional Secretariat divisions
Eheliyagoda
Kuruwita
Kiriella
Rathnapura
Elapatha
Ayagama
Imbulpe
Opanayaka
Pelmadulla
Nivithigala
Kalawana
Balangoda
Weligepola
Godakawela
Kahawaththa
Embilipitiya
Kolonna
Kalthota

Plantation companies 

The Ratnapura district includes areas managed by Five Plantation Companies. Namely, Agalawatte Plantations PLC managed by Mackwoods, Balangoda Plantations PLC managed by Stassens, Pussellawa Plantations PLC, managed by Freelanka, Hapugastenne Plantations PLC Managed by Finlays, and Kahawatte Plantations PLC managed by Forbes.

The ownership of these companies lie with the State.

References

External links 
 https://web.archive.org/web/20090203152322/http://kcc.sch.lk/
 http://www.kulocgov.com/

 
Districts of Sri Lanka